North Jeolla Province (Jeollabuk-do) is divided into 6 cities (si) and 8 counties (gun). They're also divided into 14 towns (eup), 145 townships (myeon), and 82 neighborhoods (dong).

Table

Map

Former

References

See also 
 List of cities in South Korea

Jeolla, North
Jeolla, North